The women's half marathon event at the 1997 Summer Universiade was held on the streets of Catania, Italy on 31 August. This was the first time that this event was featured at the Universiade replacing the marathon.

Results

References

Athletics at the 1997 Summer Universiade
1997 in women's athletics
1997